The 2018 season of Kabuscorp Sport Clube do Palanca is the club's 16th season in Angolan football and the 11th consecutive season in the Girabola, the top flight league of Angolan football. In 2018,  the club participated in the Girabola.

J.G.M. withdrawal
In late April, J.G.M. submitted a withdrawal request to the Angolan Football Federation citing financial reasons. The request was granted. As a result, 3 points won by Kabuscorp in its round 3 away match win against J.G.M. were withdrawn.

FIFA penalties
FIFA has instructed the Angolan Football Federation that Kabuscorp should forfeit 6 points in the league as a result of being in default to their former star player Rivaldo. In a weekly report issued by the Angolan federation, it is further stated that the club may be banned from official competition in case the claimant files a new complaint.

In June, FIFA again ruled that Kabuscorp forfeits 6 points in the league for being in default with TP Mazembe in the 2014 deal with Trésor Mputu.

Squad information

Players

Pre-season transfers

Mid-season transfers

Staff

Angolan League

League table

Results

Results summary

Results by round

Results overview

Match details

Season statistics

Appearances and goals

|-
! colspan="8" style="background:#DCDCDC; text-align:center" | Goalkeepers
|-

|-
! colspan="8" style="background:#DCDCDC; text-align:center" | Defenders

|-
! colspan="8" style="background:#DCDCDC; text-align:center" | Midfielders

|-
! colspan="8" style="background:#DCDCDC; text-align:center" | Forwards

|-
! colspan="8" style="background:#DCDCDC; text-align:center" | Total
|- align=center
| colspan="4"| || 308(80) || 42 || 308(80) || 42
|}

Scorers

Clean sheets

See also
 List of Kabuscorp S.C.P. players

External links
 Match schedule
 Girabola.com profile
 Zerozero.pt profile
 Soccerway profile
 Facebook profile

References

Kabuscorp S.C.P. seasons
Kabuscorp